A lapis manalis was either of two sacred stones used in the Roman religion. One covered a gate to Hades, abode of the dead; Sextus Pompeius Festus called it ostium Orci, "the gate of Orcus".  The other was used to make rain; this one may have no direct relationship with the Manes, but is instead derived from the verb manare, "to flow".  

The two stones had the same name.  However, the grammarian Festus held the cover to the gate of the underworld and the rainmaking stone to be two distinct stones.

Gate to the underworld

One such stone covered the mundus Cereris, a pit thought to contain an entrance to the underworld.  Most cities of Latium and Etruria contained a similar pit or ditch; Plutarch describes the custom of a mundus as being of Etruscan origin, and states that it was used as a place where first-fruits were deposited.  The Latin word mundus meant "world".  Festus, quoting Cato this time, explains that:

The Roman mundus was located in the Comitium.  This stone was ceremonially opened three times a year, during which   spirits of the blessed dead (the Manes) were able to commune with the living.  The three days upon which the mundus was opened were August 24, October 5, and November 8.  Fruits of the harvest were offered to the dead at this time. Macrobius, quoting Varro, says of these days that: 

Accordingly, he reports that military and public matters were not transacted upon them, even though they were not dies nefasti.

Charm to make rain
The other was used as part of a ceremony called the aquaelicium (Latin: "calling the waters") which sought to produce rain in times of drought. During the ceremony, the pontifices had the stone brought from its usual resting place, the Temple of Mars in Clivo near the Porta Capena, into the Senate.  Offerings were made to Jupiter petitioning for rain, and water was ceremonially poured over the stone.

See also
Lemuria, another Roman festival for the dead.
Lemures, hostile ghosts in Roman mythology.

References

Ancient Roman religion
Sacred rocks
Roman underworld
Rainmaking (ritual)